Darabad may refer to:
 Darabad, Ardabil
 Darabad, Chaharmahal and Bakhtiari
 Darabad, Golestan
 Darabad-e Shahzadeh, Razavi Khorasan Province
 Darabad, Tehran